Roshan Minz (born 21 October 1987) is an Indian field hockey player who plays as a forward. He was part of the Indian team that won gold at the 2007 Men's Hockey Asia Cup.

History 
Roshan Minz started career as a defender. He started playing forward from 2001, at Junior Nehru hockey tournament in Delhi. He was awarded "Player of the Tournament" in that game.

References

1987 births
Living people
People from Sundergarh district
Indian male field hockey players
Field hockey players from Odisha